George S. Barnes, A.S.C. (October 16, 1892 – May 30, 1953) was an American cinematographer active from the era of silent films to the early 1950s.

Biography
Over the course of his career, Barnes was nominated for an Academy Award eight times, including for his work on The Devil Dancer (1927) with Gilda Gray and Clive Brook. He won once, for his work on the Alfred Hitchcock film Rebecca (1940). "Barnes’ photographic interpretation of Rebecca is the sort of thing to which his fellow cinematographers may point, as indeed they did in bestowing upon it the industry's premiere Award, as a complete example of what truly great camerawork can mean to a production".

He was married seven times. 

His first marriage was to Helen Howell in 1915. They eventually divorced and she would later become the first wife of Frank Capra. He was married to Ethel Johnson from 1923 to 1923, then to Marie Namara from 1926 to 1932. 

He was married to Joan Blondell from 1933 to 1936 and filmed five of Blondell's Warner Bros. pictures. In fact, they met on The Greeks Had a Word for Them set in which she had the leading role. Their relationship is often said to have been intense. In an interview, Blondell stated that Barnes cured her from lying. Barnes was the biological father of Blondell's son, the television executive Norman Powell (born November 2, 1934), who was adopted in 1938 by Blondell's second husband, actor Dick Powell. 

He was married to Elizabeth "Betty" Wood from 1936 to 1938; they had a son named George Carlton Barnes (born December 18, 1937).

Barnes had two daughters with Melba Marshall Kruger (pseudonym of Melba Mae Kruger), to whom he was married from 1939 to 1945: Barbara Ann Barnes (born April 16, 1940) and Georgene S. Barnes (born May 7, 1942).

In 1947, he married for the final time, to Margaret Atkinson. 

He died at the age of 60 in Los Angeles, California, after having worked on at least 142 films. He is interred at Hollywood Forever Cemetery in Hollywood, Los Angeles, California.

Filmography 

 1918 Vive la France!
 1919 Partners Three
 1919 The Law of Men
 1919 The Haunted Bedroom
 1919 The Virtuous Thief
 1919 Stepping Out
 1919 What Every Woman Learns
 1919 Dangerous Hours
 1920 The Woman in the Suitcase
 1920 The False Road
 1920 Hairpins
 1920 Her Husband's Friend
 1920 Silk Hosiery
 1921 The Heart Line
 1921 The Bronze Bell
 1921 The Beautiful Gambler
 1921 Opened Shutters
 1922 Woman, Wake Up
 1922 The Real Adventure
 1922 Dusk to Dawn 
 1922 Conquering the Woman
 1922 Peg o' My Heart
 1923 Alice Adams
 1923 The Love Piker
 1923 Desire
 1924 Yolanda
 1924 Janice Meredith
 1925 Zander the Great
 1925 The Teaser
 1925 The Dark Angel
 1925 The Eagle
 1926 Mademoiselle Modiste
 1926 The Son of the Sheik
 1926 The Winning of Barbara Worth
 1927 The Night of Love
 1927 Venus of Venice
 1927 The Magic Flame
 1927 The Devil Dancer
 1928 Sadie Thompson
 1928 Two Lovers
 1928 Our Dancing Daughters
 1928 The Awakening
 1929 The Rescue
 1929 Bulldog Drummond
 1929 This Is Heaven
 1929 Condemned
 1929 The Trespasser
 1930 Raffles
 1930 What a Widow!
 1930 A Lady's Morals
 1930 The Devil to Pay!
 1931 One Heavenly Night
 1931 Five and Ten
 1931 Street Scene
 1931 The Unholy Garden
 1932 The Greeks Had a Word for Them
 1932 Polly of the Circus
 1932 The Wet Parade
 1932 Society Girl
 1932 Blondie of the Follies
 1932 Sherlock Holmes
 1933 Broadway Bad
 1933 Peg o' My Heart
 1933 Goodbye Again
 1933 Footlight Parade
 1933 Havana Widows
 1934 Massacre
 1934 Gambling Lady
 1934 He Was Her Man
 1934 Smarty
 1934 Dames
 1934 Kansas City Princess
 1934 Flirtation Walk
 1935 Gold Diggers of 1935
 1935 Traveling Saleslady
 1935 In Caliente
 1935 Broadway Gondolier
 1935 The Irish in Us
 1935 I Live for Love
 1935 Stars Over Broadway
 1936 The Singing Kid
 1936 Love Begins at Twenty
 1936 Cain and Mabel
 1937 Black Legion
 1937 Marked Woman
 1937 The Prince and the Pauper
 1937 Ever Since Eve
 1937 Varsity Show
 1937 The Barrier
 1937 Hollywood Hotel
 1938 Love, Honor and Behave
 1938 The Beloved Brat
 1938 Gold Diggers in Paris
 1939 Devil's Island
 1939 Jesse James
 1939 Stanley and Livingstone
 1939 Here I Am a Stranger (uncredited)
 1939 Our Neighbors – The Carters
 1940 Rebecca
 1940 Free, Blonde and 21 
 1940 Maryland
 1940 Girl from Avenue A
 1940 The Return of Frank James
 1941 Hudson's Bay
 1941 That Uncertain Feeling
 1941 Meet John Doe
 1941 Ladies in Retirement
 1941 Unholy Partners
 1941 Remember the Day
 1942 Sex Hygiene (short)
 1942 Rings on Her Fingers 
 1942 Broadway
 1942 Nightmare
 1942 Once Upon a Honeymoon
 1943 Mr. Lucky 
 1943 Jane Eyre
 1944 Since You Went Away (uncredited)
 1944 Frenchman's Creek
 1944 None But the Lonely Heart
 1945 The Spanish Main
 1945 Spellbound
 1945 The Bells of St. Mary's
 1946 From This Day Forward
 1946 Sister Kenny
 1947 Sinbad the Sailor
 1947 Mourning becomes Electra
 1948 The Emperor Waltz
 1948 Good Sam
 1948 No Minor Vices
 1948 The Boy with Green Hair
 1948 Force of Evil
 1949 Samson and Delilah
 1950 The File on Thelma Jordon
 1950 Riding High
 1950 Let's Dance
 1950 Mr. Music
 1951 Here Comes the Groom
 1952 The Greatest Show on Earth
 1952 Something to Live For
 1952 Somebody Loves Me
 1952 Just for You
 1952 Road to Bali
 1953 The War of the Worlds
 1953 Little Boy Lost

Awards and nominations
At the 13th Awards Banquet of the Academy of Motion Picture Arts and Sciences, Barnes was proclaimed the winner of the 1940 Academy Award for the year's best black-and-white cinematography in recognition of his skill in filming Rebecca.

References

 https://archive.org/stream/modernscreen34unse#page/n827/mode/2up/search/Barnes
 https://archive.org/stream/modernscreen78unse#page/n1049/mode/2up/search/George+Barnes

External links 

1892 births
1953 deaths
American cinematographers
Best Cinematographer Academy Award winners
Burials at Hollywood Forever Cemetery